The NST Minimum is a German powered hang glider that was designed and produced by NST-Machinenbau of Werther, North Rhine-Westphalia. Now out of production, when it was available the aircraft was supplied complete and ready-to-fly.

Design and development
The Minimum features a cable-braced hang glider-style high-wing, weight-shift controls, single-place or two-place accommodation, wheel-launching and landing and a single engine in pusher configuration.

The aircraft uses a standard hang glider wing, made from bolted-together aluminum tubing, with its double surface wing covered in Dacron sailcloth. The wing is supported by a single tube-type kingpost and uses an "A" frame control bar. The engine is mounted behind the pilot, while the fuel tank is mounted above. The landing gear consists of two wheels mounted below the control bar and a single tail wheel mounted on a vertical strut. A folding propeller is a standard feature.

As it takes-off and lands on wheels, the Minimum can only operate from smooth hard runways.

Operational history
The single-place version was reported in 2003 as having sold in substantial numbers.

Variants
Minimum
Minimum 1+1

Specifications (Minimum)

References

Minimum
2000s German ultralight aircraft
Single-engined pusher aircraft
Powered hang gliders